Peter Eccles may refer to:
 Peter Eccles (footballer)
 Peter Eccles (mathematician)